The Fairmount Apartments, also known as the Grand Lady of Jersey City, are located in Jersey City, Hudson County, New Jersey, United States. The Apartments were added to the National Register of Historic Places on March 3, 1995. The Apartments are an example of an early twentieth century Arts and Crafts style apartments. The building consists of two L-shaped -story brick-and-concrete structures connected by a 1-story structure.

History
The Fairmount Apartments were designed by the firm of Newman and Harris. The eastern section was constructed in 1909 and the western section was built in 1912. There were 33 apartments in each section. The building was purchased in 1962 by Father Divine. The building was renovated in 1995 and currently has 59 apartments of senior residences.

See also
Bergen Section, Jersey City
National Register of Historic Places listings in Hudson County, New Jersey

References

External links
 View of Fairmount Apartments via Google Street View

History of Jersey City, New Jersey
Buildings and structures in Jersey City, New Jersey
Residential buildings completed in 1909
Residential buildings on the National Register of Historic Places in New Jersey
Apartment buildings in New Jersey
National Register of Historic Places in Hudson County, New Jersey
Apartment buildings in Jersey City, New Jersey
New Jersey Register of Historic Places
American Craftsman architecture in New Jersey